Grenora Centennial Airport  is a city-owned, public-use airport located one nautical mile (1.85 km) northeast of the central business district of the City of Grenora, in Williams County, North Dakota, United States.

Facilities and aircraft 
It has one runway designated 17/35 with a turf surface measuring 2,600 by 100 feet (792 x 30 m).

References

External links 
 Aerial photo as of 10 August 1995 from USGS The National Map via MSR Maps
 

Defunct airports in the United States
Airports in North Dakota
Buildings and structures in Williams County, North Dakota